Bjørn Bakken (born 20 July 1941) is a Norwegian former sports shooter. He competed at the 1968 Summer Olympics and the 1972 Summer Olympics.

References

External links
 

1941 births
Living people
Norwegian male sport shooters
Olympic shooters of Norway
Shooters at the 1968 Summer Olympics
Shooters at the 1972 Summer Olympics
People from Hurdal
Sportspeople from Viken (county)
20th-century Norwegian people